Manickam may refer to:

KR. RM. Kariya Manickam Ambalam, Indian politician, social worker, and former Member of the Legislative Assembly
C. Manickam, Indian politician and former Member of the Legislative Assembly of Tamil Nadu
Kambar Manickam, Priest of the Tamil Evangelical Lutheran Church
M. Manickam, Ceylon Tamil politician and member of the Senate of Ceylon
M. S. Manickam (born 1946), Indian politician, businessman, farmer, and former member of the Legislative Assembly of Tamil Nadu
Manickam Yogeswaran (A.K.A. Yoga), Sri Lankan Tamil musician and exponent of Carnatic music

See also
Manaivi Oru Manickam (transl. Wife is a gem), 1990 Indian Tamil-language thriller film
Manaiviye Manithanin Manickam (transl. Wife is the ruby of a man), 1959 Indian Tamil-language film
Manitharil Manickam (transl. A Jewel Among Humans), 1973 Indian Tamil-language film
Mathar Kula Manickam (transl. A gem among women), 1956 Indian Tamil-language drama film
Manigam
Manikkam
ManyCam